Village Enterprise (formerly known as Village Enterprise Fund) is a 501(c)(3) nonprofit organization that works to end extreme poverty through entrepreneurship and innovation. A pioneer in the quest to help rural Africans lift themselves out of extreme poverty, Village Enterprise employs local leaders who then implement a community-based poverty graduation program that has been adapted for different contexts in Africa.  Village Enterprise has trained more than 240,000 ultra-poor individuals, helped them establish over 66,000 businesses, and transformed the lives of over 1.4 million women children and men in Kenya, Uganda, Rwanda, Tanzania, Mozambique, and the Democratic Republic of Congo.

Village Enterprise plays a unique role in the poverty reduction and microenterprise development fields by successfully serving people who live below the extreme poverty level of $1.90 a day or less, especially women and youth, who are historically underserved by other NGOs. By combining highly effective targeting with group-based business creation through cash transfers, business and financial literacy training, ongoing mentoring, and access to savings groups, Village Enterprise provides participants with a sustainable path out of extreme poverty. Village Enterprise's goal is to transform 20 million lives by 2030.

Over 95% of Village Enterprise's staff are East African and include in-country leadership in Kenya, Uganda, and Rwanda.  Village Enterprise's staffing model was recognized in the Spring 2013, 10th Anniversary edition of the Stanford Social Innovation Review.

History
Village Enterprise was co-founded in 1987 by Brian Lehnen and Joan Hestenes to show how "entrepreneurship can help the very poor create businesses and experience the dignity of long-lasting jobs." For the first several years, Village Enterprise remained a small, volunteer-run organization that was operated from their home.

After working as a Village Enterprise intern in East Africa, Jessica Jackley co-founded Kiva, the world's first peer-to-peer online microlending platform, in 2005.

In 2008, Village Enterprise trained The BOMA Project on its microenterprise model.

Village Enterprise hired its first outside CEO, Dianne Calvi, in 2010

The Village Enterprise graduation model was refined in 2011 to include rigorous targeting methodology, a one-year training program, and a savings program in addition to a cash grant and mentoring.

In 2017, Village Enterprise launched the first Development Impact Bond (DIB) for poverty alleviation in Sub-Saharan Africa.

Innovations for Poverty Action completed a multi-year, independent Randomized Controlled Trial (RCT) of the Village Enterprise program in 2018.  The RCT studied 6,378 of the poorest households in 138 villages in rural Uganda and found that the Village Enterprise program led to increases in consumption, assets, income, and savings, as well as improvements in nutrition, food security, and subjective wellbeing of business owners and their families.

Program
According to the World Bank, 767 million people in the world live in extreme poverty (less than $1.90 a day), with nearly 400 million residing in Sub-Saharan Africa.

Village Enterprise works in remote, rural areas of East Africa where over 60% of the population live in extreme poverty.

Village Enterprise's graduation program consists of a set of sequenced interventions which are recognized by the Consultative Group to Assist the Poor (CGAP) as "key components to put very poor people on a sustainable pathway out of extreme poverty." According to Nicholas Kristof in The New York Times, "the graduation program gives very poor families a significant boost that continues after the program ends." Common elements of graduation programs include business training and mentoring, start-up grants or an asset transfer, and access to savings. Other organizations that follow a graduation model also provide limited consumption support, though Village Enterprise does not.

The Village Enterprise poverty graduation model has five major stages:

 Targeting: Village Enterprise finds individuals who live under $1.90 a day using Innovations for Poverty Action's Poverty Probability  Index (PPI) combined with a village-based Participatory Wealth Ranking and invites them to join the program. 
 Training: Local business mentors assist the participants to form three-person business groups.  They then train participants in business, financial skills, family support, and conflict resolution.
 Business Savings Groups (BSGs):  Participants join BSGs, a group of approximately 10 businesses (30 entrepreneurs), which become a self-generated, self-managed form of microfinance. BSGs serve as a safety net and a Village Enterprise exit strategy as a BSG typically continues to meet after the program ends. 
 Cash Transfer: Each three-person business group receives seed capital in the form of a cash grant. Village Enterprise business mentors guide new business owners through selecting an enterprise that is best suited to flourish, taking into account the team's skill set, risk factors, profitability, and local market conditions and value chains.
 Mentoring: Through a strong network of local business mentors, Village Enterprise provides business mentoring to help the new entrepreneurs gain confidence, overcome challenges, expand their businesses, and become self-sufficient.

Village Enterprise gives grants rather than loans, as people living in areas that Village Enterprise serves typically don't have access to banks or are not ready to take on a loan. Research finds that microloans have not shown to be successful in leading the ultra-poor out of extreme poverty.

Typical Village Enterprise businesses include farming, livestock, tailoring, and small retail businesses. Each business has three business owners, to diversify risk and pool skill sets, and one business supports an average of 20 people based on the average family size in the area. Approximately 75% of Village Enterprise business owners are women.

Village Enterprise uses TaroWorks to collect data via smartphones and to then analyze and report on the impact of its program.

Randomized controlled trial 

A randomized controlled trial (RCT) is considered the "gold standard" of evidence in the social sciences for measuring the direct impact of any intervention. For the Village Enterprise RCT, independent researchers from Innovations for Poverty Action worked with Village Enterprise to identify more than 6,168 of the poorest households across 138 villages in rural Uganda, and randomly assigned them to one of five treatment arms (including unconditional cash transfers) or a control group to compare variations of Village Enterprise's model.

Results shared by IPA in 2018 found that the Village Enterprise's program led to increases in consumption, assets, income, and savings, as well as improvements in nutrition, food security, and subjective wellbeing of business owners and their families. Subjective wellbeing includes happiness and life satisfaction across an index of community indicators, such as the empowerment of women. In addition, at 1/2 to 1/10th the cost of other graduation programs, the Village Enterprise program is estimated by research to have a full cost recovery in three to four years and all program-related costs in two to three years.

Development Impact Bond

Development Impact Bonds (DIBs) are a new pay-for-success funding mechanism that guarantees that donor money will be linked to measurable results. Selected from over 80 organizations based on the strength of the RCT results, Village Enterprise launched the first DIB for poverty alleviation in Africa in November 2017.

Nine impact investors, including the Delta Fund, the Silicon Valley Social Venture Fund (SV2), the Bridges Impact Foundation and several individuals are providing the working capital for the Village Enterprise DIB with the goal of Village Enterprise starting 4,600 small sustainable businesses and equipping 13,800 rural Africans who currently live on less than US $1.90 a day with the resources to become successful entrepreneurs. Outcome funders include the world's two largest development agencies USAID and DFID (UK Aid), as well as an anonymous philanthropic fund. The outcome funders will pay Village Enterprise and its investors a sliding scale return-on-investment based on verifiable increases in incomes and net assets (as a proxy for income), rather than the traditional model of payment upon program delivery.

Instiglio, a pioneer in results-based financing, is performing the role of project manager, and Global Development Incubator (GDI) is the trustee of the 'outcomes fund'. An additional RCT conducted by IDinsight is underway to independently validate the DIB outcomes.  The first results from the RCT are expected in fall 2021.

Areas of work and impact

Refugees

In 2018, Village Enterprise partnered with Mercy Corps Uganda on a project funded by the ECHO Foundation to adapt Village Enterprise's microenterprise Graduation program for refugees. The pilot paired newly arrived refugees with host community members to launch small businesses.  This promote resilience and reduced aid reliance across three refugee settlements in West Nile, Uganda: Bidi Bidi, Rhino Camp, and Palorinya. The pilot consortium also includes CARE, Save the Children, and Oxfam.

Youth

Over 75% of Africa's population is younger than 35. Most rural youth are unemployed with very few economic opportunities.

In Northern Uganda, Village Enterprise works with Mercy Corps on the Mastercard Foundation-funded DYNAMIC program (Driving Youth-led New Agribusiness and Microenterprise) to train youth to start agriculture-based businesses. The focus on youth was inspired by the results of a Youth Study conducted in Spring 2014 in partnership with FHI 360 and USAID to identify retention, training, and business selection strategies for the Village Enterprise program. This study was a November 2015 finalist of a USAID Collaborative, Learning, and Adaptation Case Competition.

Women 

As of 2019, 75% of Village Enterprise's business owners are women.

According to the UN World Food Program findings, women and girls are most affected by neglect in rural, poverty-stricken areas. 7 out of 10 of the world's hungry are women and girls. In East Africa, women are more likely to be illiterate, perform unpaid work, and eat less in lean times than men.

Founders Pledge, a charity through which company founders and investors commit to donating a percentage of their personal proceeds to a charity of their choice following a successful exit, endorsed Village Enterprise in 2018 as a top charity for women's empowerment.

In 2014, Village Enterprise participated in a Boston Consulting Group study on empowering women entrepreneurs, and specifically, the importance of social capital and networks for their success.

Financial inclusion

Often the poor remain or slide back into poverty due to financial setbacks from a medical illness or death of a family member. Savings Groups are increasingly recognized as a valuable vehicle for helping the "unbanked" transcend extreme poverty.  Village Enterprise's Business Savings Groups (BSGs) provide a safe place to save, a way to take out business loans, and access interest-free financing for family emergencies. BSGs act as both insurance against catastrophes and as banks with a source of capital for business expansion.

Village Enterprise became an early adopter in the "savings revolution" by adding this component to their model in 2011. Across Kenya and Uganda, each BSG saved an average of $1,300 in FY16. In 2014, Village Enterprise participated in a Mastercard Foundation research study of practices and possibilities for savings and provided extensive data on the needs and preferences of 139 BSG members in Uganda.

In 2013, Village Enterprise launched its Smarter Market Analysis and Risk Assessment Tool (SMART), to determine the profitability, risk, sustainability, demand, and price fluctuation of different crops at the local market level. The tool was recognized by the Rockefeller Foundation's 100 Next Century Innovators (among 1,000+ applicants).

Funding 
Village Enterprise is funded by individuals, foundations, corporations, and government and multilateral organizations, including USAID, USAID Development Innovation Ventures, and DFID.

Replication 
Village Enterprise Extend was established in 2017 to make a bold impact on accelerating the pace of poverty alleviation. Through Extend, Village Enterprise is transferring its expertise to mission-aligned partners who are interested in replicating Village Enterprise's proven Graduation program in African countries beyond Kenya and Uganda. In 2018, Village Enterprise expanded to the Democratic Republic of the Congo in conjunction with the African Wildlife Foundation.

Village Enterprise's goal is to impact 20 million lives by 2030.

External reviews
In 2021, Village Enterprise was a winner of the Larsen Lam ICONIQ Impact Award ($10.25 million) for its Delivering Resilient Enterprises and Market Systems (DREAMS) for refugees project. </ref>

In 2019, Village Enterprise was a finalist for the Drucker Prize for Innovation. In 2018, Village Enterprise was a semi-finalist.

In 2014, 2015, 2016, 2017, 2018, 2019, 2020, and 2021 Village Enterprise received Charity Navigator's highest 4-star rating.

In 2016, 2017, 2018, 2019, 2020, and 2021 Village Enterprise was selected by The Life You Can Save as one of their top, evidence-based charities.

In 2018, 2019, 2020, and 2021 Village Enterprise was endorsed by Founder's Pledge as a top charity for women's empowerment.

2010-2015 Village Enterprise received Guidestar's gold rating for five consecutive years. In 2018, 2019, 2020, and 2021 Village Enterprise received Guidestar's highest Platinum rating.

In 2016, Village Enterprise underwent an extensive impact audit by ImpactMatters and received their highest ratings for impact, monitoring and evaluation, and iteration and learning. In 2016, Village Enterprise was selected finalist of the Classy Award. Those finalists are chosen based on their scale and scope of the problem, their innovative approach, ability to solve the problem, and organizational effectiveness.

In 2015, Village Enterprise's grants-based ultra poor program was recognized by Innovations for Poverty Action and featured in The New York Times.

2015 -2021 Village Enterprise received Great Nonprofit's "top rated nonprofit" award.

In 2012, the Rockefeller Foundation recognized Village Enterprise as a Next Century Innovator for developing SMART (Smarter Market Analysis Risk Tool), a mobile agricultural tool that identifies risk/reward factors for small-scale farmers to consider when deciding which crop(s) to plant.

In 2010, Charity evaluator GiveWell rated Village Enterprise as one of their top charities.

Media 
Village Enterprise has been covered in The New York Times, Devex, World Finance Magazine, VOX, USAID Impact Blog, and other news and opinion sources.

(Links will be to these articles):

Devex: 
October 6, 2017 New DIB brings in big donors, provides biggest test of model to date 
February 15, 2018 Ultra-poor graduation model shows more than just cash is needed.

USAID Impact Blog: 
October 30, 2017 Ensuring Effective Development 

Non-Profit Chronicles:
November 21, 2017 Village Enterprise: Alleviating Poverty, Delivering Results 

World Finance Magazine
September 25, 2018 
The emergence of development impact bonds

VOX
October 15, 2018
Giving out cash is a great way to fight poverty. This approach might be even better.

New York Times
May 21, 2015
The Power of Hope Is Real

References

Organizations established in 1987